Folketing elections were held in Denmark on 26 July 1881. Liberals won the largest number of seats, whilst voter turnout was around 55.6%.

Results

References

Denmark
1881 07
1881 in Denmark
Denmark